The 1897 Prince Edward Island general election was held in the Canadian Province of Prince Edward Island on 28 July 1897.

References

1897 elections in Canada
Elections in Prince Edward Island
1897 in Prince Edward Island
July 1897 events